Fara was a Palestinian Arab village in the Safad Subdistrict. It was depopulated during the 1948 Arab-Israeli War on October 30, 1948, under Operation Hiram. It was located 11.5 km north of Safad on the Wadi al-Fara.

History
According to the PEF's Survey of Western Palestine (SWP) this place seems to be the most probable site of Caphar Farara (or Farawa), where was the tomb of R. Nahum of Gimzo, as mentioned in the various Jewish itineraries from 1210 to 1664  C.E.

Ottoman era
During the early Ottoman era in 1596, Fara was part of the nahiyah ("subdistrict") of Jira, part of the   Liwa  ("district") of Safad.   It had a population of 40 households and 11 bachelors; an estimated 281 persons, all Muslim.  They  paid  a fixed tax rate of 25% on agricultural products, including  wheat, barley,  olive trees, vineyards, goats and beehives, in addition to occasional revenues and a press for olive oil or grape syrup; a total of 3,832  akçe. Half of the revenues went to a  waqf.

In 1838 Farah was noted as a village in the Safad district, while in 1881  the SWP described Farah as having “Mud and basalt houses, containing about 100 Moslems. It is situated on a plain, cultivated as arable land. Water from Wady Far'ah and from cisterns and birket." The villagers cultivated olive and fig trees and vineyards.

A population list from about 1887 showed  Farah to have  an estimated 385 Muslim  inhabitants.

British Mandate era
In the 1922 census of Palestine conducted by the British Mandate authorities, ‘’Fara‘’ had a population of 218, all Muslims except 1 Christian,  increasing slightly in the 1931 census to 229,  all  Muslims,  in  a total of 42  houses.

In the 1944/5 statistics it had a population of 320 Muslims, with a total of 7,229  dunums of land. Of this,   3,738  were used for  cereal, 173   were irrigated or used for orchards,   while 38 dunams were classified as built-up, (urban),  land.

1948, aftermath

In 1992 the village site was described: "One stone building (probably a mosque) stands on the site, as well as several stone terraces. On the whole, however, the site is overgrown with grass and fig trees. Less than 1 km north of it lies the settlement of Yir'on. A portion of the land around the village is planted with fruit trees, such as apples, but the land along the valley’s slope is deserted and uncultivated."

References

Bibliography

External links
 Welcome To Fara
 Fara,  Zochrot, 
 Fara, Villages of Palestine
Survey of Western Palestine, Map 4: IAA, Wikimedia commons

Arab villages depopulated during the 1948 Arab–Israeli War
District of Safad